Paul Xie Ting-zhe (1931 – 14 August 2017) was a Roman Catholic bishop.

Xie Ting-zhe was ordained to the priesthood in 1980. He was ordained a bishop clandestinely in 1991 and served as bishop for the Apostolic Prefecture of Xinjiang, China, until his death.

Notes

1931 births
2017 deaths
21st-century Roman Catholic bishops in China
20th-century Roman Catholic bishops in China
People from Xinjiang